Samoan dance traditions reflect contact between Samoan culture and other cultures from the East and West. The space in which dance is conducted has been interpreted as a microcosm of Samoan society.

Samoan dance has been characterized as a means of maintaining Samoan identity in contact with other civilizations.

Traditional dances
 Fa'ataupati
 Maulu'ulu
 Sasa
 Siva afi
 Siva tau
 Taualuga
 Matamatame
 'Ailao

References